Lieutenant General Hugh Mackay Gordon (1760 – 12 March 1823) was a British Army officer who became Lieutenant Governor of Jersey.

Military career
Gordon joined the British Army in 1775 and served in the American War of Independence being taken as a Prisoner of war during the Siege of Pensacola in 1781. He served in the West Indies from 1793 and became Assistant Quartermaster-General in the East Indies in 1798. He was appointed Inspector of militia in Jersey in 1799 and joined the staff in Madeira in 1811. In 1816 he went on to be Lieutenant Governor of Jersey.

He was also Colonel of the 16th (Bedfordshire) Regiment from 1816 to 1823.

There is a memorial to him in St James's Church, Piccadilly.

References

|-

1760 births
1823 deaths
British Army lieutenant generals
Governors of Jersey
Burials at St James's Church, Piccadilly
British Army personnel of the American Revolutionary War